Glen Royall Mill Village Historic District is a historic mill town and national historic district located at Wake Forest, Wake County, North Carolina. The district encompasses 82 contributing buildings and 1 contributing site built between about 1900 and 1949 and located in a residential section of the town of Wake Forest.  It includes notable examples of Bungalow / American Craftsman style architecture. Located in the district is the separately listed Royall Cotton Mill Commissary.  Other notable buildings include the Royall Cotton Mill (1899-1900), the Powell-White House (1909-1910), and pyramidal cottages, triple-A cottages, and shotgun houses.

The district was listed on the National Register of Historic Places in 1999.

References

Historic districts on the National Register of Historic Places in North Carolina
Geography of Wake County, North Carolina
National Register of Historic Places in Wake County, North Carolina